Norwegian POW Museum (Krigsfangemuseet i Schildberg) is a Norwegian museum devoted to the history of Norwegian World War II Prisoners of War once interned in the German prisoner of war camp in Schildberg during the Nazi occupation of Norway. The museum is located in Ostrzeszów, Poland.

Background
A prisoner-of-war camp, Stalag XXI-A, was established in some of the town buildings in Schildberg, in Nazi occupied Poland  during 1940. In 1943, the camp was renamed Oflag XXI-C for the imprisonment of 1,150 military officers transferred from Norway. On August 16, 1943  the German Wehrmacht arrested all Norwegian officers who were still in Norway. Of the approximately 1,500 officers who were detained, probably one third were sent home the following week because of age, illness, etc. The remainder were to become prisoners of the Nazis in Poland.

Beginnings 
In 1982, Eyvind Grundt from Moss, Norway, was sent to Poland on a mission for the Norwegian Red Cross. After completing his work, he began a search for the town where his father had spent two years as a Prisoner of War (POW) during World War II. It was a difficult task, since he only knew the German name of the town, Schildberg.

After many inquiries, Grundt found that Schildberg was a small Polish city of Ostrzeszów. In Ostrzeszów, by chance, he made contact with Lechoslaw Nowakowski, a language professor at the local college. Nowakowski had a good knowledge of the history of the town and shared Grundt's interest in the fate of the 1,150 Norwegian POWs once interned there at Stalag XXI-A.

They discovered that Grundt’s father had been interned in the building that now houses the town’s largest technical school. In the cellar of the school, several Norwegian artifacts were discovered, including a dented tin plate engraved “Kaptein Vagn Enger”. Grundt contacted the manager of the local museum, Josef Janas and they agreed to create a small Norwegian collection in the museum. Initially, it was in the right drawer of the manager’s desk.

Exhibits 
Since 1982, a number of objects connected to the Norwegian POWs have been collected, in both Norway and Poland. Several special exhibitions to present them were arranged at first, but from 1996 onwards, the Norwegian collection has had a permanent exhibition area in the newly renovated Ostrzeszów museum. The collection of objects continues, and the museum has developed into an information and competence centre concerning Norwegian POWs in general. The museum is engaged in collecting the abundant literature relating to the subject.

What makes the Norwegian POW Museum especially unique is photographic collection of one of the former POWs of the Ostrzeszów camp. After managing to smuggle a small camera into the camp, the prisoner used chocolate and cigarettes from his Red Cross parcels to “buy” film from the German guards. Thus he could document many aspects of POW life in a unique way. Many of his photographs have been enlarged and cover the walls in the museum.

It is rather unusual to find a Norwegian museum far outside the borders of the country. The inhabitants of Schildberg (Ostrzeszów) are proud of being able to display the unique history that they and Norway share. In 2003 more than 6000 persons visited the POW museum; including Polish and Norwegian families and individuals. The museum intends to publish several booklets covering the fate of the POWs. Information will also be published on the internet.

Scope 
The museum covers the military POWs in the local Stalag XXI-A, as well as sub-camps of the Oflag XXI C (Oflag XXI-C in Schokken, Oflag XXI-C/Z in Grune bei Lissa and Stalag III-A and Oflag III-A of Luckenwalde).

The museum has future plans to cover POWs in Stalag Luft III (Sagan) and Marlag und Milag Nord (Tarmstedt an der Timke). Later still, other groups of prisoners, such as interned civilians, police prisoners and students will be covered. Prisoners in KZ- and NN-camps, in hard labour camps and jails (political prisoners and “criminals”), as well as prisoners in Norway, will not be included.

References

External links
Schildberg Oflagu XXI C

Norwegian POW Museum
Norwegian POW Museum
Defunct prisons in Poland
Ostrzeszów County
Museums in Greater Poland Voivodeship
Norway in World War II